Nyctia halterata is a species of true flies in the family Sarcophagidae.

References

Sarcophagidae
Diptera of Europe
Insects described in 1798